Charles Joseph (7 August 1649 – 27 January 1664) was an Archduke of Austria and Grand Master of the Teutonic Knights (1662–64). He was also the bishop of Olmütz, and Breslau, Passau.

Charles Joseph was born in Vienna as the son of Ferdinand III, Holy Roman Emperor and his first cousin, Maria Leopoldine of Austria. His mother died shortly after giving birth to him. Charles Joseph, himself, died in his early teens in Linz.

Ancestry

References 

1649 births
1664 deaths
17th-century House of Habsburg
17th-century Roman Catholic bishops in the Holy Roman Empire
Grand Masters of the Teutonic Order
Nobility from Vienna
Prince-Bishops of Breslau
Austrian princes
Burials at the Imperial Crypt
Burials at St. Stephen's Cathedral, Vienna
Sons of emperors
Royalty and nobility who died as children
Children of Ferdinand III, Holy Roman Emperor
Sons of kings